The 2015 UEFA European Under-19 Championship qualifying competition was a men's under-19 football competition played in 2014 and 2015 to determine the seven teams joining Greece, who qualified automatically as hosts, in the 2015 UEFA European Under-19 Championship final tournament. A total of 53 UEFA member national teams entered the qualifying competition.

Format
The qualifying competition consisted of two rounds:
Qualifying round: Apart from Spain, which received a bye to the elite round as the team with the highest seeding coefficient, the remaining 52 teams were drawn into 13 groups of four teams. Each group was played in single round-robin format at one of the teams selected as hosts after the draw. The 13 group winners, the 13 runners-up, and the third-placed team with the best record against the first and second-placed teams in their group advanced to the elite round.
Elite round: The 28 teams were drawn into seven groups of four teams. Each group was played in single round-robin format at one of the teams selected as hosts after the draw. The seven group winners qualified for the final tournament.

Tiebreakers
If two or more teams were equal on points on completion of a mini-tournament, the following tie-breaking criteria were applied, in the order given, to determine the rankings:
 Higher number of points obtained in the mini-tournament matches played among the teams in question;
 Superior goal difference resulting from the mini-tournament matches played among the teams in question;
 Higher number of goals scored in the mini-tournament matches played among the teams in question;
 If, after having applied criteria 1 to 3, teams still had an equal ranking, criteria 1 to 3 were reapplied exclusively to the mini-tournament matches between the teams in question to determine their final rankings. If this procedure did not lead to a decision, criteria 5 to 9 applied;
 Superior goal difference in all mini-tournament matches;
 Higher number of goals scored in all mini-tournament matches;
 If only two teams had the same number of points, and they were tied according to criteria 1 to 6 after having met in the last round of the mini-tournament, their rankings were determined by a penalty shoot-out (not used if more than two teams had the same number of points, or if their rankings were not relevant for qualification for the next stage).
 Lower disciplinary points total based only on yellow and red cards received in the mini-tournament matches (red card = 3 points, yellow card = 1 point, expulsion for two yellow cards in one match = 3 points);
 Drawing of lots.

To determine the best third-placed team from the qualifying round, the results against the teams in fourth place were discarded. The following criteria were applied:
 Higher number of points;
 Superior goal difference;
 Higher number of goals scored;
 Lower disciplinary points total based only on yellow and red cards received (red card = 3 points, yellow card = 1 point, expulsion for two yellow cards in one match = 3 points);
 Drawing of lots.

Qualifying round

Draw
The draw for the qualifying round was held at UEFA headquarters in Nyon, Switzerland on 28 November 2013 at 10:15 CET (UTC+1).

The teams were seeded according to their coefficient ranking, calculated based on the following:
2011 UEFA European Under-19 Championship final tournament and qualifying competition (qualifying round and elite round)
2012 UEFA European Under-19 Championship final tournament and qualifying competition (qualifying round and elite round)
2013 UEFA European Under-19 Championship final tournament and qualifying competition (qualifying round and elite round)

Each group contained two teams from Pot A and two teams from Pot B.

For political reasons, if Azerbaijan and Armenia (due to the disputed status of Nagorno-Karabakh), as well as Georgia and Russia (due to the disputed status of South Ossetia), were drawn in the same group, neither would host the mini-tournament.

Notes
Greece (Coeff: 8.667) qualified automatically for the final tournament as hosts.

Groups
Times up to 25 October 2014 were CEST (UTC+2), thereafter times were CET (UTC+1).

Group 1

Group 2

Group 3

Group 4

Group 5

Group 6

Group 7

Group 8

Group 9

Group 10

Group 11

Group 12

Group 13

Ranking of third-placed teams
To determine the best third-placed team from the qualifying round which advanced to the elite round, only the results of the third-placed teams against the first and second-placed teams in their group are taken into account.

Elite round

Draw
The draw for the elite round was held at UEFA headquarters in Nyon, Switzerland on 3 December 2014 at 11:20 CET (UTC+1).

The teams were seeded according to their results in the qualifying round. Spain, which received a bye to the elite round, were automatically seeded into Pot A. Each group contained one team from Pot A, one team from Pot B, one team from Pot C, and one team from Pot D. Teams from the same qualifying round group could not be drawn in the same group.

Before the draw UEFA confirmed that, for political reasons, Ukraine and Russia could not be drawn in the same group due to the Russian military intervention in Ukraine.

Groups
Times up to 28 March 2015 were CET (UTC+1), thereafter times were CEST (UTC+2).

Group 1

Group 2

Group 3

Group 4

Group 5

Group 6

Group 7

Qualified teams
The following eight teams qualified for the final tournament.

1 Bold indicates champion for that year. Italic indicates host for that year.

Top goalscorers
The following players scored four goals or more in the qualifying competition.

10 goals

 Ramil Sheydayev

5 goals

 Marko Kvasina
 Patrick Roberts
 Federico Bonazzoli
 Abdelhak Nouri
 Tomáš Vestenický
 Nicolas Hunziker

4 goals

 Bradley Fewster
 Lucas Cueto
 Timo Werner
 Nikola Vujnović
 Rifat Zhemaletdinov
 Alen Ožbolt
 Borja Mayoral
 Aldin Turkes
 Enes Ünal

References

External links

Qualification
2015